Strange Spirits is a 1979 album by the Skatt Brothers.

Casablanca supported this release with a single release in the U.S. of "Dancing' for the Man" backed with "Walk the Night." A video was also created by Polygram Records (Australia) for "Life at the Outpost" which was deemed a total misrepresentation of the Skatt Bros, as it contained none of the band members, but actors performing choreography. Nonetheless, the song was released as a single in other markets, notably in Australia where it was backed with "Midnight Companion", and reached gold record status. The KISS connections continue on this album, apart from the obvious Sean Delaney one: a KISS pinball machine features on the album's rear cover photograph.

Release details
In 2010, European music company Premium Series reissued Strange Spirits with a bonus track: Walk the Night (12 inch version). The reissue claimed to be "24 Bit Digitally Remastered From Original Master Tapes".

Track listing

2010 bonus track

Charts

Personnel
Sean Delaney - Keyboards
Pieter Sweval - Bass
Richard Martin-Ross - Guitar
David Andez - Lead Guitar
Richie Fontana - Drums
Craig Krampf - Drums

Recording
'''Auxiliary musicians:
Brian Russell
Michael Toles
Errol Thomas
Carl Marsh
Barry Keane
Recorded at: Phase One Recording Studios Limited, Toronto, Ontario, Canada
First Engineer: George Semkiw
Assistant Engineers: Mick Walsh, Jeff Stobbs, Robin Brouwers
Mastered at Sterling Sound by George Marino
Art Direction: Phyllis Chotin
Design: Gribbitt!
Photography: Dean Tokuno

References

1979 albums
Casablanca Records albums